Datuk Chuah Thean Teng (191425 November 2008), also known as Cai Tianding, was a Malaysian artist who is widely credited for developing batik as a painting technique.

Early life and education
Chuah Thean Teng was born in 1914 in Fujian, China; Chuah's father traded sundries while his mother made shoes for women with bound feet. The family emigrated to Penang, Malaysia when Chuah was 14; Chuah returned to Fujian to pursue an education at the Xiamen Academy of Fine Arts, but was forced to return to Malaysia due to an illness. He subsequently experimented with various art media on his own under the pseudonym Choo Ting, while working part-time as an art teacher.

Career
Following World War II, Chuah opened a batik factory in Penang. While the venture quickly proved to be a failure, Chuah subsequently became recognised for his unique batik artworks and in 1955, he held his first batik art exhibition. He established the art and antique gallery Yahong Art Gallery in 1975. His artwork was featured on UNESCO greeting cards in 1989.

Final years
Chuah was awarded the Penang Heritage Trust's Living Heritage Award in 2005. He remained active in his final years and died on 25 November 2008 aged 96. Chuah is survived by three sons, all of whom are also artists: Siew Teng (born 1944), Seow Keng (born 1945), and Siew Kek (born 1946).

Legacy
Chuah Thean Teng is widely regarded as the "father of batik art" who developed batik as a means of painting; "his adaptation of the traditional batik medium into an accepted form of painting ... elevated the status of batik as a craft to an art medium." Chuah's self-portrait, which uses batik to depict a "very strong gaze showing his (Chuah's) sense of determination", was the first artwork to be registered in the National Collection of visual art at the National Gallery Singapore.

References

1914 births
2008 deaths
20th-century Malaysian artists
Chinese emigrants to Malaysia
Malaysian people of Hokkien descent
Malaysian people of Chinese descent